Show Me is the debut album by the R&B–dance trio the Cover Girls released on independent label Fever Records. The album would produce the hit title track, "Show Me", as well as the Top 40 singles "Because of You" and "Promise Me". This would be the only album to feature original member Sunshine Wright, who would depart the group after the unsuccessful release of second single "Spring Love" and would be replaced by Margo Urban for the remainder of the album's singles. The other two members of the original lineup for this album were Angel Mercado and Caroline Jackson. The album peaked at No. 64 on the Billboard Hot 200 on 26 February 1988 and No. 74 on Billboards Top R&B/Hip-Hop Albums chart on 4 March 1988.

Critical reception
Alex Henderson of AllMusic wrote in his review that "the Cover Girls made some memorable contributions to Latin freestyle -- in fact, their debut album, Show Me, is among freestyle's most important releases."

Robert Christgau remarked: "Set on pulling a marketable girl group out of a Latin hip hop concept, their svengalis channel the mix toward wall-of-sound, fuzzing beats and harmonies with a nostalgic soupcon of Spectorian grandeur."

Track listing

Charts
Album - Billboard (United States)

Singles - Billboard (United States)

Personnel
Angel Clivillés
Caroline Jackson
Sunshine Wright

References

External links
Fever Records official site

1986 debut albums
The Cover Girls albums